Queen Heonsuk of the Gyeongju Gim clan or known Empress Heonseung was a Silla princess as the daughter of King Gyeongsun who became a Goryeo queen consort through her marriage with King Gyeongjong as his first and primary wife.

Posthumous name
In April 1002 (5th year reign of King Mokjong), name On-gyeong (온경, 溫敬) was added.
In March 1014 (5th year reign of King Hyeonjong), name Gong-hyo (공효, 恭孝) was added.
In April 1027 (18th year reign of King Hyeonjong), name Yang-hye (양혜, 良惠), Ui-mok (의목, 懿穆) and Sun-seong (순성, 順聖) was added.
In October 1056 (10th year reign of King Munjong), name Hoe-an (회안, 懷安) was added.
In October 1253 (40th year reign of King Gojong), name In-hu (인후, 仁厚) was added to her Posthumous name too.

In popular culture
Portrayed by Yang Eun-young in the 2009 KBS2 TV series Empress Cheonchu.

References

External links
Queen Heonsuk on Encykorea .

Royal consorts of the Goryeo Dynasty
Korean queens consort
951 births
Silla people
Year of death unknown
10th-century Korean people
Gim clan of Gyeongju